The Royal Jubilee Exhibition, Liverpool, was held in Liverpool in 1887 on the occasion of the Golden Jubilee of Queen Victoria. It had a theme of the Arts of Peace and War.

Opening
The exhibition was opened on 16 May 1887 by Princess Louise, daughter of Queen Victoria, and her husband the Marquess of Lorne with a musical performance from local choirs, the Exhibition Orchestra, and the band of the Coldstream Guards. Dramatic performances took place at the Royal Victoria Theatre.

Theme
The theme of the exhibition was the Arts of Peace and War with trophies of war and mementoes of famous explorations lent by Queen Victoria. It included life-size depictions of "Old Liverpool" that were reproduced for The Graphic.

See also
International Exhibition of Navigation, Commerce and Industry (1886)

References

Further reading
Eves, C. Washington. (1887) Jamaica at the Royal Jubilee Exhibition Liverpool 1887. London: Spottiswoode.

External links 

Exhibitions in the United Kingdom
Liverpool
1887 in England